John Clark Monk(s) (25 February 1760 – 9 December 1827), also known as the Hanging Sailor of Perryman, was a sea captain.

Monks was born in Siston near Bristol, England and died in 1827. He is entombed at Perryman Cemetery, Maryland, USA, along with both his wives (first wife Mary and second wife Sarah Rebecca Lewis).

He apparently left his crew instructions that when he died, his feet were not to touch dry land for any reason. To meet that requirement his body was lowered into an underground vault, where it was suspended from the ceiling with chains. To ensure that the casket didn't rot away, it was made of metal, and Monks' body was soaked in rum.

References

1760 births
1827 deaths
People from Siston
English sailors
People from Perryman, Maryland